Vamoose Bus is a privately owned intercity bus line located in New York City. It provides daily transportation between New York City and three suburban cities in the Washington, DC metro area.

Route and stop locations 

The New York City pickup and drop-off stop is located in Midtown Manhattan near Penn Station/Madison Square Garden. The Washington, DC metro area stops are located in Bethesda, MD; Arlington, VA (Rosslyn area) and Lorton, VA. The Lorton route was initiated in January 2011.

Service overview 

The price for a seat on the Vamoose Bus starts at $20. In 2010, Vamoose added a new luxury service called the "Gold Bus". The gold bus primarily targets business travelers willing to pay a premium for first-class services i.e. wide leather seats, more legroom, fewer passengers per bus etc. The fare for a seat on the Gold Bus starts at $50.

Tickets must be purchased in advance via the website or by telephone. Upon purchase, passengers are given a reservation number and a printable e-ticket which is also sent via email.

Rewards program 

Vamoose Bus maintains a loyalty program, similar to the frequent flyer program offered by many airlines. Vamoose Bus customers who are enrolled in the program would accumulate points corresponding to the amount paid for the seat. Once the applicable points threshold has been reached, the customer can then redeem them towards free trips on Vamoose Bus.

Other services 
 Vamoose Bus provides luggage storage service for customer who wish to store their bags during their stay in New York City.
 In May 2015, Vamoose Bus initiated a new sprinter-van transportation service in New York City. The service provides small groups with shuttle transportation to/from area airports and other NYC metro area destinations.

Legal proceedings 

Launched in 2004, Vamoose Bus initially served Tenleytown (near American University) and Downtown Washington, D.C., but in 2006 the company moved the stops outside the District of Columbia, after an injunction was obtained by Washington Deluxe, a competing bus line.

In 2007, Vamoose Bus planned to launch a route between Boston and New York City. The company was prevented from serving this area by the Boston Transportation Department. Vamoose Bus was also unable to secure a permit in nearby Cambridge.

See also
Chinatown bus lines
Intercity coach service
Wanderu, a search engine for intercity bus service.

References

External links

 Vamoose Bus website

Intercity bus companies of the United States
Transportation companies based in New York City
2004 establishments in New York City
Bus transportation in New York (state)
Bus transportation in Virginia
Bus transportation in Maryland
Transport companies established in 2004